The 2018 Hungaroring FIA Formula 2 round was a pair of motor races held on 28 and 29 July 2018 at the Hungaroring in Mogyoród, Hungary as part of the FIA Formula 2 Championship. It was the eighth round of the 2018 FIA Formula 2 Championship and was run in support of the 2018 Hungarian Grand Prix.

Classification

Qualifying

Feature race

Notes
 – Sérgio Sette Câmara had ten seconds added to his race time for causing contact with Antonio Fuoco.
 – George Russell started from pit lane due to clutch problem.
 – Ralph Boschung set the fastest lap in the race but because he finished outside the top 10, the two bonus points for fastest lap went to Nyck de Vries as he set the fastest lap inside the top 10 finishers.

Sprint race

Notes
 – Antonio Fuoco set the fastest lap in the race but because he finished outside the top 10, the two bonus points for fastest lap went to Luca Ghiotto as he set the fastest lap inside the top 10 finishers.

Championship standings after the round

Drivers' Championship standings

Teams' Championship standings

References

External links 
 

Budapest
Budapest Formula 2
Budapest Formula 2